

Municipal flag

Granted flag

See also

References

External links 
 
 The Public Register of Arms, Flags and Badges of Canada

Flags of cities in Ontario
Flag